Tripos is a genus of marine dinoflagellates in the family Ceratiaceae. It was formerly part of Ceratium, then separated out as Neoceratium, a name subsequently determined to be invalid.

Species 
 Tripos aequatorialis (Schröder) F.Gómez
 Tripos aestuarius (Schröder) F.Gómez
 Tripos allieri (Gourret) F.Gómez
 Tripos angustocornis (N.Peters) F.Gómez
 Tripos angustus (A.S.Campbell) F.Gómez
 Tripos arcticus (Vanhöffen) F.Gómez
 Tripos arietinus (Cleve) F.Gómez
 Tripos aultii (H.W.Graham & Bronikovsky) F. Gómez
 Tripos axialis (Kofoid) F.Gómez
 Tripos azoricus (Cleve) F.Gómez
 Tripos balechii (Meave del Castillo, Okolodkov & M.E.Zamudio) F.Gómez
 Tripos balticus (F.Schütt) F.Gómez
 Tripos batavus (Paulsen) F.Gómez
 Tripos belone (Cleve) F.Gómez
 Tripos berghii (Gourret) F.Gómez
 Tripos biceps (Claparède & Lachmann) F.Gómez
 Tripos bicornis (Gourret) F.Gómez
 Tripos bigelowii (Kofoid) F.Gómez
 Tripos boehmii (H.W.Graham & Bronikovsky) F.Gómez
 Tripos brevis (Ostenfeld & Johannes Schmidt) F.Gómez
 Tripos brunellii (Rampi) F.Gómez
 Tripos bucephalus (Cleve) F.Gómez
 Tripos buceros (Zacharias) F.Gómez
 Tripos californiensis (Kofoid) F.Gómez
 Tripos candelabrus (Ehrenberg) F.Gómez
 Tripos carnegiei (H.W.Graham & Bronikovsky) F.Gómez
 Tripos carriensis (Gourret) F.Gómez
 Tripos cephalotus (Lemmermann) F.Gómez
 Tripos ceylanicus (Schröder) F.Gómez
 Tripos claviger (Kofoid) F.Gómez
 Tripos coarctus (Pavillard) F.Gómez
 Tripos compressus (Gran) F.Gómez
 Tripos concilians (Jørgenen) F.Gómez
 Tripos contortus (Gourret) F.Gómez
 Tripos contrarius (Gourret) F.Gómez
 Tripos curvicornis (Daday) F.Gómez
 Tripos dalmaticus (Schröder) F.Gómez
 Tripos declinatus (G.Karsten) F.Gómez
 Tripos deflexus (Kofoid) F.Gómez
 Tripos dens (Ostenfeld & Johannes Schmidt) F.Gómez
 Tripos denticulatus (Jörgenen) F.Gómez
 Tripos depressus (Gourret) F.Gómez
 Tripos digitatus (F.Schütt) F.Gómez
 Tripos dilatatus (Gourret) F.Gómez
 Tripos divaricatus (Lemmermann) F.Gómez
 Tripos egyptiacus (Halim) F.Gómez
 Tripos ehrenbergii (Kofoid) F.Gómez
 Tripos elegans (Schröder) F.Gómez
 Tripos euarcuatus (Jörgenen) F.Gómez
 Tripos eugrammus (Ehrenberg) F.Gómez
 Tripos extensus (Gourret) F.Gómez
 Tripos falcatiformis (Jörgenen) F.Gómez
 Tripos falcatus (Kofoid) F.Gómez
 Tripos filicornis (Steemann Nielsen) F.Gómez
 Tripos flagelliferus (Cleve) F.Gómez
 Tripos furca (Ehrenberg) F.Gómez
 Tripos fusus (Ehrenberg) F.Gómez
 Tripos gallicus (Kofoid) F.Gómez
 Tripos geniculatus (Lemmermann) F.Gómez
 Tripos gibberus (Gourret) F.Gómez
 Tripos globatus (Gourret) F.Gómez
 Tripos globosus (Gourret) F.Gómez
 Tripos gracilis (Pavillard) F.Gómez
 Tripos gravidus (Gourret) F.Gómez
 Tripos heterocamptus (Jörgenen) F.Gómez
 Tripos hexacanthus (Gourret) F.Gómez
 Tripos hircus (Schröder) F.Gómez
 Tripos horridus (Cleve) F.Gómez
 Tripos humilis (Jörgenen) F.Gómez
 Tripos hundhausenii (Schröder) F.Gómez
 Tripos hyperboreus (Cleve) F.Gómez
 Tripos incisus (Karsten) F.Gómez
 Tripos inclinatus (Karsten) F.Gómez
 Tripos inflatus (Karsten) F.Gómez
 Tripos intermedius (Jörgenen) F.Gómez
 Tripos inversus (Karsten) F.Gómez
 Tripos japonicus (Schröder) F.Gómez
 Tripos karstenii (Pavillard) F.Gómez
 Tripos kofoidii (Jörgenen) F.Gómez
 Tripos lamellicornis (Kofoid) F.Gómez
 Tripos lanceolatus (Kofoid) F.Gómez
 Tripos leptosomus (Jörgensen) F.Gómez
 Tripos limulus (Pouchet) F.Gómez
 Tripos lineatus (Ehrenberg) F.Gómez
 Tripos longinus (Karsten) F.Gómez
 Tripos longipes (J.W.Bailey) F.Gómez
 Tripos longirostrus (Gourret) F.Gómez
 Tripos longissimus (Schröder) F.Gómez
 Tripos lunula (Schimper ex Karsten) F.Gómez
 Tripos macroceros (Ehrenberg) F.Gómez
 Tripos massiliensis (Gourret) F.Gómez
 Tripos minor (Gourret) F.Gómez
 Tripos minutus (Jörgensen) F.Gómez
 Tripos mollis (Kofoid) F.Gómez
 Tripos muelleri Bory de Saint-Vincent
 Tripos neglectus (Ostenfeld) F.Gómez
 Tripos obesus (Pavillard) F.Gómez
 Tripos obliquus (Gourret) F.Gómez
 Tripos obtusus (Gourret) F.Gómez
 Tripos okamurae (Schröder) F.Gómez
 Tripos orthoceras (Jörgensen) F.Gómez
 Tripos ostenfeldii (Kofoid) F.Gómez
 Tripos oviformis (Daday) F.Gómez
 Tripos pacificus (Schröder) F.Gómez
 Tripos palmatus (Schröder) F.Gómez
 Tripos paradoxides (Cleve) F.Gómez
 Tripos parvus (Gourret) F.Gómez
 Tripos patentissimus (Ostenfeld & Johannes Schmidt) F.Gómez
 Tripos pavillardii (Jørgensen) F.Gómez
 Tripos pellucidus (Gourret) F.Gómez
 Tripos pennatus (Kofoid) F.Gómez
 Tripos pentagonus (Gourret) F.Gómez
 Tripos petersenii (Steemann Nielsen) F.Gómez
 Tripos platycornis (Daday) F.Gómez
 Tripos praelongus (Lemmermann) Gómez
 Tripos procerus (Gourret) F.Gómez
 Tripos protuberans (G.Karsten) F.Gómez
 Tripos pulchellus (Schröder) F.Gómez
 Tripos ramakrishnii (Subrahmanyan) F.Gómez
 Tripos ranipes (Cleve) F.Gómez
 Tripos recurvatus (Schröder) F.Gómez
 Tripos recurvus (Jørgesen) F.Gómez
 Tripos reflexus (Cleve) F.Gómez
 Tripos reticulatus (Pouchet) F.Gómez
 Tripos robustus (Ostenfeld & Johannes Schmidt) F.Gómez
 Tripos rostellus (Gourret) F.Gómez
 Tripos saltans (Schröder) F.Gómez
 Tripos scapiformis (Kofoid) F.Gómez
 Tripos schmidtii (Jørgesen) F.Gómez
 Tripos schoeteri (Schröder) F.Gómez
 Tripos schrankii (Kofoid) F.Gómez
 Tripos semipulchellus (Jørgesen) F.Gómez
 Tripos seta (Ehrenberg) F.Gómez
 Tripos setaceus (Jørgesen) F.Gómez
 Tripos strictus (Okamura & Nishikawa) F.Gómez
 Tripos subcontortus (Schröder) F.Gómez
 Tripos subrobustus (Jørgesen) F.Gómez
 Tripos subsalsus (Ostenfeld) F.Gómez
 Tripos sumatranus (Karsten) F.Gómez
 Tripos symmetricus (Pavillard) F.Gómez
 Tripos tasmaniae (E.J.F.Wood) F.Gómez
 Tripos tenuissimus (Kofoid) F.Gómez
 Tripos tricarinatus (Kofoid) F.Gómez
 Tripos trichoceros (Ehrenberg) Gómez
 Tripos tripodioides (Jørgesen) F.Gómez
 Tripos truncatus (Lohmann) F.Gómez
 Tripos uncinus (Sournia) F.Gómez
 Tripos uteri (A.S.Campbell) F.Gómez
 Tripos varians (Mangin) F.Gómez
 Tripos volans (Cleve) F.Gómez
 Tripos vultur (Cleve) F.Gómez

References

External links 
 
 
 
 Tripos at the World Register of Marine Species (WoRMS)

Dinoflagellate genera
Gonyaulacales